Ellen Marie Granberg is an American sociologist and academic administrator serving as the provost and senior vice president for academic affairs at Rochester Institute of Technology (RIT). She is the incoming president of George Washington University, with a starting date of July 1, 2023.

Education 
Granberg has an undergraduate bachelor's degree from the University of California at Davis. She earned her  master's and Ph.D. degrees from Vanderbilt University.

Career 
Granberg was a sociology professor at Clemson University where she worked on nutrition science and obesity. She spent seventeen years at Clemson before moving to Rochester Institute of Technology where she was named provost in 2018. In 2023 Granberg was named as the incoming president of George Washington University, the first woman to hold the position of president at the university; Granberg will start on July 2, 2023.

References

External links 
 Welcoming Dr. Ellen Granberg as the 19th President of the George Washington University, January 11, 2023 - Youtube video
 

University of California, Davis alumni
Vanderbilt University alumni
American women sociologists
Living people
Year of birth missing (living people)
American sociologists
Clemson University faculty
Rochester Institute of Technology administrators
American women academics
21st-century social scientists
21st-century American academics